Hellinsia tepidus is a moth of the family Pterophoridae that is endemic to Costa Rica.

The forewings are ferruginous‑ochreous with some dark fuscous irroration. The hindwings are grey.

References

tepidus
Moths described in 1922
Endemic fauna of Costa Rica
Moths of Central America